Jason Fischer may refer to:

Jason Fischer (fighter) (born 1985), American mixed martial artist
Jason Fischer (politician) (born 1983), American politician from Florida
Jason Fischer (writer), Australian author of fiction